Sant'Agata di Puglia is a town and comune in the province of Foggia in the Apulia region of southeast Italy.

Its territory borders the municipalities of Accadia, Anzano di Puglia, Candela, Deliceto, Lacedonia (AV), Monteleone di Puglia, Rocchetta Sant'Antonio, and Scampitella (AV).

References

Cities and towns in Apulia